Garðar Jóhannsson (born 1 April 1980 in Garðabær) is a retired Icelandic football striker.

Career
Fredrikstad bought Garðar for 2 million NOK in August 2006, only a month after he was bought for 100.000 NOK by an Icelandic club. Because Garðar had played for KR Reykjavík and Valur after 1 July 2006, he had to wait almost one year before he could play matches for Fredrikstad.

Garðar made his debut in Tippeligaen against Vålerenga on 26 May 2007, where he scored the only goal of the match. He scored 18 goals in 58 matches for Fredrikstad. On 22 January 2010, he joined 2. Bundesliga club Hansa Rostock.

Garðar later played for Strømsgodset, where he played six matches and scored one goal in the 2010 season.

References

Garðar Jóhannsson aðstoðarþjálfari Fylkis (Staðfest), fotbolti.net, 14 November 2015

External links
 
 
 

1980 births
Living people
Gardar Johannsson
Gardar Johannsson
Gardar Johannsson
Gardar Johannsson
Gardar Johannsson
Fredrikstad FK players
FC Hansa Rostock players
Strømsgodset Toppfotball players
Eliteserien players
2. Bundesliga players
Gardar Johannsson
Expatriate footballers in Norway
Expatriate footballers in Germany
Gardar Johannsson
Gardar Johannsson
Association football forwards